Britt Brøndsted (born June 1, 1981) is a right-handed, Danish ten-pin bowler and one of Denmark's top female ten-pin bowlers.

In 2003 she was the World Ranking World Tenpin Masters Champion. In 2004 she was the European Ranking Champion; also in 2004 she was the Greece Brunswick Euro Challenge Champion and the Qatar International Champion.

In 2006 she competed in the World Tenpin Masters tournament.

External links
Foundation300 profile

1981 births
Danish ten-pin bowling players
Living people